is a Japanese professional Go player.

Biography 
Shinji Takao is one of Japan's best Go players. He turned professional in 1991. He won the Honinbo tournament in 2005 by a half point in the last game. Cho U, Naoki Hane, Keigo Yamashita and Takao make up the group of players in Japan called the "Four Heavenly Kings".  He was a student of Fujisawa Shuko, 9P.

Rivalry with Keigo Yamashita
Takao's rivalry with Keigo began in August 1986 during a televised match. The match was the final of the All-Japan Elementary School Championship, where an 8 year-old Keigo defeated a 9 year-old Shinji to capture the title. Their rivalry would continue on, striking again in 1996 when Shinji got his revenge. Shinji beat Yamashita in the Shinjin-O semi-final, going on to defeat Nakamura Shinya in the final. In 1998, this time in the final of the Shinjin-O, Yamashita beat Takao 2-1 to capture the title. Their title matches would continue to go back and forth, with Takao getting the latest strike by beating Yamashita in the challenger's final for the Judan in 2003.

Titles and runners-up

External links
GoGameWorld Player Info for Takao Shinji
 Player info for Takao Shinji at Nihonki-in 

Japanese Go players
1976 births
Living people
Asian Games medalists in go
Go players at the 2010 Asian Games
Asian Games bronze medalists for Japan
Medalists at the 2010 Asian Games